Jason John Kerr (born 6 February 1997) is a Scottish professional footballer who plays as a defender for Wigan Athletic.

Career
Kerr started his career at St Johnstone in 2014, spending two seasons on loan at East Fife from 2015 to 2017, winning the Scottish League Two title in the 2015–16 season.

On 10 August 2017, Kerr, along with St Johnstone team-mate Chris Kane, joined Scottish Championship club Queen of the South on loan until 31 January 2018. On 21 October, Kerr scored the only goal at Glebe Park, Brechin in Queens 1–0 win over Brechin City and was subsequently sent-off in injury time with Ally Love of The City. However, Queens appealed the red card decision and this was overturned to a yellow card instead for unsporting behaviour.

On 14 January 2018, Kerr was recalled to the Perth club when his loan spell in Dumfries ended with the Doonhamers. Kerr made his debut appearance for St Johnstone on 29 January 2018, in a Scottish Cup fourth round 4–0 win against Albion Rovers at Cliftonhill.

Ahead of the 2019–20 season, Kerr was named as St Johnstone's club captain, following the departure of Joe Shaughnessy. He led the team to success in both the Scottish League Cup and Scottish Cup in 2020-21.

International career 

Selected for the Scotland under-21 squad in the 2018 Toulon Tournament, the team lost to Turkey in a penalty-out and finished fourth.

Career statistics

Honours
East Fife
Scottish League Two: 2015–16

St. Johnstone
Scottish Cup: 2020–21
Scottish League Cup: 2020–21

Wigan Athletic
EFL League One: 2021–22

Individual
SPFL Premiership Team of the Season: 2020–21

References

External links

1997 births
Living people
Scottish footballers
Association football defenders
St Johnstone F.C. players
East Fife F.C. players
Queen of the South F.C. players
Scottish Professional Football League players
Scotland under-21 international footballers
English Football League players